The En Concert Tour was the first concert tour of the French recording artist Alizée. It started at the famous Olympia music hall in Paris. The tour was generally well received although not all of the concerts sold out. The original plan had 43 dates but two of them got cancelled. Near the end of the tour, one extra concert date was added to bring the tour back to Paris, this time at the huge Zénith de Paris music hall. She also had one concert in both Switzerland and Belgium. With the two cancelled and one added date, the total number of concerts held was 42.

Background and development

Following the release of Mes Courants Électriques, Alizée went on a countrywide tour of France, along with a performance each in Belgium and Switzerland, during the second half of 2003. The tour started off with a performance on 26 August 2003 in Paris. It concluded with her performance on the prestigious l'Olympia hall in Paris and  eve of 17 January 2004 at the Le Zénith concert hall in the same city and had covered major cities including Lyon, Rouen, Lille, Grenoble and Dijon. A live CD and DVD, titled Alizée En Concert, composed of selected performances from her tour, was launched a year later in the fall of 2004. The audio CD contained tracks, taken from her two studio albums. The DVD featured video footage of the same performances as on the CD, along with bonus footage of her rehearsals.

Set list
"Intralizée"
"L'Alizé"
"Hey! Amigo!"
"Toc de mac"
"J'en ai marre!"
"Lui ou toi"
"Gourmandises"
"L'e-mail a des ailes"
"Mon maquis"
"J.B.G."
"Moi... Lolita"
"Amélie m'a dit"
"Parler tout bas"
"C'est trop tard"
"Youpidou"
"Tempête"
"À contre-courant"
"J'ai pas vingt ans"
"Générique de fin"

Concerts

Cancelled Concerts

Reception
Allmusic [ link]

References

Alizée albums
2004 live albums
2004 video albums
Live video albums
Polydor Records live albums
Polydor Records video albums